Bromobenzene is an aryl halide, C6H5Br. It is a colourless liquid although older samples can appear yellow. It is a reagent in organic synthesis.

Synthesis and reactions
Bromobenzene is prepared by the action of bromine on benzene in the presence of Lewis acid catalysts such as aluminium chloride or ferric bromide.

Bromobenzene is used to introduce a phenyl group into other compounds.  One method involves its conversion to the Grignard reagent, phenylmagnesium bromide. This reagent can be used, e.g. in the reaction with carbon dioxide to prepare benzoic acid.   Other methods involve palladium-catalyzed coupling reactions, such as the Suzuki reaction. Bromobenzene is used as a precursor in the manufacture of phencyclidine.

Toxicity
Animal tests indicate low toxicity.  Little is known about chronic effects.

For liver toxicity, the 3,4-epoxide are proposed intermediates.

See also
Fluorobenzene
Chlorobenzene
Iodobenzene

References

Bromobenzenes
Phenyl compounds